Rapanea striata is a species of broadleaf evergreen plant in the family Primulaceae. It is endemic to India.

References

striata
Endemic flora of India (region)
Endangered plants
Taxonomy articles created by Polbot